Sholl & Fay was the architectural firm of Charles Sholl and Calvin Fay which was active in the 19th century. The partnership existed between 1852 and 1857. They were responsible for the renovations of the City Exchange, Savannah Medical College and several Italianate buildings in Savannah, Georgia, where they were based.

In 1855, they were in discussions regarding potential renovations at the Georgia State House. They submitted sketches and an estimate for completion of between $125,000 and $150,000. It is not known whether they undertook the renovations.

Fay went on to be a partner with another Georgia architect, Alfred Eichberg, between 1881 and 1888.

Notable works
Jones and Telfair Range, 112–130 West Bay Street, Savannah, Georgia (1852–1854) – now the Cotton Sail Hotel
Louisa Porter Home, 23 East Charlton Street, Savannah, Georgia (1853)
City Exchange, Bay Street (1854) – portico (building now demolished; replaced in 1905 by today's Savannah City Hall
Powell Building, Central State Hospital, Milledgeville, Georgia (1856)
Claghorn and Cunningham Range, 102–110 East Bay Street, Savannah, Georgia (1857)
Jones and Derenne Range, 124 East Bay Street, Savannah, Georgia (1857) – now River Street Inn

Gallery

References

American architects
Architecture firms based in Georgia (U.S. state)